WXEF 97.9 FM is a radio station broadcasting a hot adult contemporary format. Licensed to Effingham, Illinois, the station is owned by Premier Broadcasting, Inc.

References

External links
WXEF's official website

XEF